"Glory to the Brave" is a song by the Swedish power metal band HammerFall, from the album Glory to the Brave, released as a single on 20 October 1997. On this release there are four songs. One was recorded live, one is a radio edit and two are a bonus track from a previous studio album, which can only be found on special copies.

The band say that the lyrics in this song are a tribute to long lost friends who died too early. "Even though they are not around anymore, they have a place in my heart forever." The dedication to Klas Fors, is to Joacim's grandfather, who died before the recording.

The cover photo was made by Richard Jakobsen.

This is a re-recording of Hammerfall's demo EP.

Track listing

1994 Demo track listing

Single line-up
Joacim Cans - lead and backing vocals
Oscar Dronjak - guitars and backing vocals
Glenn Ljungström - guitar (1, 2 & 4)
Fredrik Larsson - bass guitar (1, 2 & 4)
Stefan Elmgren - lead guitar and backing vocals
Magnus Rosén - bass guitar
Patrik Räfling - drums

References

External links
Album information

1997 singles
HammerFall songs
Heavy metal ballads
Songs written by Joacim Cans
Songs written by Oscar Dronjak
Nuclear Blast Records singles
Songs written by Jesper Strömblad
1997 songs